Broomhill Pool is a Grade II listed lido on Sherrington Road in Ipswich, Suffolk, England.

Status

Broomhill Pool opened on 30 April 1938 and closed in the autumn of 2002.

The lido was built in 1938 for £17,000 by the County-Borough of Ipswich. It was designed by E. McLauchlan, the County-Borough Engineer and Surveyor.

Thanks to the work of local campaigners and the Twentieth Century Society, Broomhill Pool secured Grade II listing in August 2001.

The lido is built within Broomhill Park. It is close to Broomhill Library which was built in 1942 as a WW2 bomb-proof decontamination unit. 
Broomhill Library was Grade II listed in 2012. English Heritage highlighted the "Group value: the relationship between the former gas decontamination centre and the adjacent Broomhill lido holds important group value; the style of the decontamination centre was designed to mirror the facade of the adjacent Broomhill Lido (listed at Grade II), and both were designed by Borough Engineer E. McLauchlan".

Broomhill Pool is a founding member of Historic Pools of Britain  "Established in 2015, Historic Pools of Britain is the first body ever to represent historic swimming pools in this country. These unique indoor and outdoor pools make a significant contribution to the social and architectural history of Britain and play a hugely important role in our communities"

Janet Smith wrote, in her definitive book "Liquid Assets" (Published 2005): “Broomhill may lack the national profile accorded to Saltdean, Tinside or Penzance, but it is arguably their equal in architectural significance”.

Proposed restoration
The Broomhill Pool Trust is a registered charity (No.1102659) which aims to restore Broomhill Pool; the last remaining Olympic length, grade II listed lido in Suffolk & Norfolk for full public use.

In December 2017, Fusion Lifestyle secured Heritage Lottery Funding stage 2 full grant of £3.4m. Fusion will invest over £2m. 
In August 2018 Ipswich Borough Council increased their commitment to £1.5m to secure the scheme.

The £7.25m restoration commenced in 2020 and the pool is due to reopen in 2021.

References

External links
 The Broomhill Pool Trust
 Broomhill Pool Trust Facebook Page
 Historic Pools of Britain
 Youtube Broomhill Pool 1947 and 2001 footage
 https://web.archive.org/web/20160317123721/https://www.hlf.org.uk/about-us/media-centre/press-releases/major-national-lottery-grant-restore-and-reopen-ipswich%E2%80%99s-grade

Grade II listed buildings in Ipswich
Lidos
1938 establishments in England